Harold Albert Wilson FRS (1 December 1874 – 1964) was an English physicist.

Early life
Wilson was born in York, the son of Albert William Wilson, a goods manager with the North British Railway.  His mother, Anne Gill, was the daughter of a farmer and innkeeper from Topcliffe.

Wilson was educated at St Olave's Grammar School. He then studied science at Victoria University College in Leeds and then at University College, London, graduating BSc in 1896. He then went to Cambridge University and gained a BA and DSc.

Career
In 1896 he became a colleague of English physicist J. J. Thomson at Cambridge University, and performed one of the earliest measurements of the electron's charge. He was awarded his Doctor of Science degree from London in 1900, and was elected Fellow of Trinity College, Cambridge in October 1901. From 1901 to 1904, he held a James Clerk Maxwell fellowship at the Cavendish Laboratory. He became a lecturer in Physics at King's College London, then professor at the college in 1905. In 1906 he was elected a Fellow of the Royal Society of London (FRS).

In 1909 he accepted a role as professor of Physics at McGill University in Montreal in Canada, staying there three years.

He joined the Rice Institute located in Houston, Texas in 1912, becoming the first chair of the physics department. He was one of the original 12 founding professors.

He returned to Britain in 1924, spending a year at the University of Glasgow. In 1925 he was elected a Fellow of the Royal Society of Edinburgh. His proposers were Charles Glover Barkla, Frederick Orpen Bower, John Walter Gregory and Sir John Graham Kerr.

In 1925 he returned to Rice University in Houston (also working as a consultant to an oil company) and continued there until retiral in 1947.

He died in a hospital in Houston on 13 October 1964.

Family

In 1912 he married Marjorie Patterson Smyth.

Harold had one sister, Lilian, who would marry Sir Owen W. Richardson.

Recognition

The Wilson Award at Rice University is named after him.

Publications

Electrical Conductivity of Flames (1912)
Experimental Physics (1915)
Modern Physics (1928)
Mysteries of the Atom (1934)

References

1874 births
1964 deaths
People from York
Fellows of the Royal Society
English physicists
Rice University faculty
Academics of King's College London